Phosducin, also known as PDC, is a human protein and gene. It belongs to the phosducin family of proteins.

This gene encodes a phosphoprotein, which is located in the outer and inner segments of the rod cells in the retina. This protein may participate in the regulation of visual phototransduction or in the integration of photoreceptor metabolism. It modulates the phototransduction cascade by interacting with the beta and gamma subunits of the retinal G-protein transducin. By associating with these subunits only, the Transducin alpha subunit will remain active for longer. This will increase the amount of time of visual excitation.

This gene is a potential candidate gene for retinitis pigmentosa and Usher syndrome type II. Alternatively spliced transcript variants encoding different isoforms have been identified.

See also
Phosducin family

References

Further reading